Kameshnik is a rural locality (a village) and the administrative center of Kameshnikovskoye Rural Settlement, Sheksninsky District, Vologda Oblast, Russia. The population was 66 as of 2002.

Geography 
Kameshnik is located 55 km north of Sheksna (the district's administrative centre) by road. Kirgody is the nearest rural locality.

References 

Rural localities in Sheksninsky District